Ministerial by-elections to the Parliament of the United Kingdom at Westminster were held from 1801 to the 1920s when a Member of Parliament (MP) was appointed as a minister in the government. Unlike most Westminster by-elections, ministerial by-elections were often a formality, uncontested by opposition parties. Re-election was required under the Succession to the Crown Act 1707. This was in line with the principle established in 1624 that accepting an office of profit from the Crown would precipitate resignation from the House, with the option of standing for re-election. Typically a minister sought re-election in the constituency he had just vacated, but occasionally contested another seat which was also vacant. In 1910 The Times newspaper noted that the relevant Act had been passed in the reign of Queen Anne "to prevent the Court from swamping the House of Commons with placemen and pensioners", and described the process as "anomalous" and "indefensible" in the 20th century. The Re-Election of Ministers Act 1919 ended the necessity to seek re-election within nine months of a general election, and the Re-Election of Ministers Act (1919) Amendment Act 1926 ended the practice in all other cases.

Ministerial by-elections

34th Parliament (1924–1929)

31st Parliament (1919–1922)

30th Parliament (August 1914 – 1918)

10th Parliament (1831–1832)

9th Parliament (1830–1831)

8th Parliament (1826–1830)

7th Parliament (1820–1826)

6th Parliament (1818–1820)

5th Parliament (1812–1818)

4th Parliament (1807–1812)

3rd Parliament (1806–1807)

2nd Parliament (1802–1806)

1st Parliament (1801–1802)

See also 
 List of ministerial by-elections to the Parliament of Great Britain (pre-1801)

References

Ministerial